James Martin Self (born August 20, 1943) is an American tubist and composer from Los Angeles.  Self has performed extensively in Los Angeles and internationally as a soloist, chamber musician, orchestral tubist, and, most notably, as a studio musician in the Los Angeles movie studios having appeared on over 1500 soundtracks. He is also known for his association with the Pasadena Symphony, the Pacific Symphony, the Los Angeles Opera and the Hollywood Bowl Orchestra.

Childhood, education, and early career 
James Martin Self was born on August 20, 1943, in Franklin, Pennsylvania, the third youngest of four siblings born to Helen Louise (née Martin, 1907–1980) and James Warren "Pete" Self (1906–1959), and grew up in neighboring Oil City, Pennsylvania. His father, James, worked as an assistant production manager at the Worthington Corporation and was a softball and baseball player. His mother, Helen, was a member of his hometown's First Baptist Church. His older brother, William, worked as an electrical engineer.

After graduating from Oil City High School in 1961, Self went to Indiana State College (now known as Indiana University of Pennsylvania). He studied under trumpeter William Becker, whom he considered a "a father figure and a kind of soul mate". In 1965, he earned his bachelor's degree in music education.

After graduation, Self joined the United States Army Band. The concert band tuba section included Leo Hurst,  Bob Pallansch, Dan Perantoni, Chester Schmitz, and Paul Scott.  During his time with the US Army Band, Self earned a Master of Music in Tuba Performance from Catholic University of America and studied with Harvey Phillips.

Self left the Army Band in 1967. He was offered the position of Assistant Professor of Tuba and the University of Tennessee in 1969.

In 1971, while still working at the University of Tennessee, Self began working on a Doctor of Musical Arts degree at the University of Southern California.  At USC he studied under Tommy Johnson.

Los Angeles

Studio career
Self has performed on the Los Angeles studios since 1974.  In this time he has recorded over 1500 soundtracks for motion pictures and television.  One of Self's most notable soundtrack credits is his performance on Close Encounters of the Third Kind.  His performance was featured as the "voice of the mothership."  Self can be heard as a soloist in such films as Jurassic Park, Home Alone I&II, Casper, Batteries Not Included, Sleepless in Seattle, and Dennis the Menace. Jim Self has been the first call tubist for such notable film composers as John Williams, James Newton Howard, John Debney and James Horner. In recent years, he performed on John Williams' scores for The Force Awakens, The Last Jedi, and The Rise of Skywalker. Self often doubles on cimbasso for soundtrack work, particularly since the late 1990s.

Orchestral performances 
Jim Self holds principal tuba positions with the Hollywood Bowl Orchestra (1991–present), Pasadena Symphony (1975-present), Pacific Symphony (1986–present), 
Los Angeles Opera (1986–present), and Opera Pacific (1987-2008). In his opera orchestra performances he plays the cimbasso when required. Self is also a frequent substitute tubist with the Los Angeles Philharmonic.

Teaching 
Jim Self has taught at the University of Southern California since 1976.  At USC Self teaches tuba and coaches brass chamber music.  Self taught at the University of Tennessee from 1969-1975.  He has also taught at such festivals as Music Academy of the West and the Henry Mancini Institute.

Compositions 
Self has published over 90 solo, chamber, and symphonic works.  In 2008 the Pacific Symphony performed his composition, Tour de Force: Episodes for Orchestra. The 13 minute work has also been transcribed for wind ensemble and was co-premiered by the USC Thornton Wind Ensemble under the direction of H. Robert Reynolds and the IUP Wind Ensemble under the direction of Jack Stamp.

Awards 
Harvey Phillips Award (ITEA), 2010

Roger Bobo Award for Excellence in Recording (ITEA), 2008 - InnerPlay

Lifetime Achievement Award (ITEA), 2008

Distinguished Alumni Award, Indiana University of Pennsylvania, 2003

Most Valuable Player Award (Tuba), National Association of Recording Arts and Sciences, 1983, 1985, 1986, 1987

President, International Tuba Euphonium Association, 1979-1981

Solo/chamber/jazz discography

References

External links 
 www.bassethoundmusic.com

1943 births
Living people
American tubists
Indiana University of Pennsylvania alumni
Musicians from Pennsylvania
Musicians from Los Angeles
USC Thornton School of Music alumni
USC Thornton School of Music faculty
University of Tennessee faculty
21st-century tubists
20th-century tubists